Conte Carlo Leoni (1812, Padua – 1872) was an Italian historian and epigraphist.  Above all, he recorded several inscription on the city walls of Padua, which (inspired by the Romantic taste for the medieval) were characterised more by prosopography and grandiloquence than by historical precision.

1812 births
1872 deaths
19th-century Italian historians
Writers from Padua
Epigraphers